The DCBank Pro Cycling Team was a Canadian UCI Continental cycling team established in 2012. Their stated goals are to specialize in U23 riders and develop talent. Norco, Axiom, and GS-6 are sponsors of the team. The team was not registered with the UCI in 2020. The five years the team was at the continental level, they did not achieve any UCI category victories.

2019 roster
Ages at 31 December 2019

References

UCI Continental Teams (America)
Cycling teams established in 2012
Cycling teams based in Canada